The International TerraStar is a medium-duty truck (Class 4 and 5) that was manufactured by International Trucks from 2010 to 2015.  The smallest conventional-cab truck ever produced by International, the TerraStar competed against chassis-cab vehicles derived from pickup trucks along with the smallest versions of the Freightliner M2 and Hino 600.  Though never officially designated by the company as a replacement for the 2006-2009 CityStar LCF COE, the TerraStar is of similar dimensions and GVWR.  

The model line is the smallest of the International NGV model family, sharing a cab with the International DuraStar medium-duty truck.  In terms of payload, the TerraStar also served as the successor to the light-GVWR 4100 series within the DuraStar range.

Following the discontinuation of the MaxxForce 7 engine, International withdrew the model line after 2015 production.  For 2019, the company returned to the size segment with the International CV, produced in a joint venture by International alongside the Chevrolet 4500-6500HD medium-duty line of trucks.

Model overview 

Sharing its cab with the International DuraStar, WorkStar, TranStar, and ProStar, the TerraStar is distinguished by its lower-profile hood (with smaller wheels on both axles) and cab.  To create a lower mounting position for the cab, the fuel tanks were relocated from below the cab to behind it (remaining on the frame rails).  The hood was fitted with a nearly flat grille and square sealed-beam headlights (similar to the WorkStar).  

As with the DuraStar and WorkStar, the model line was offered in a two-door cab alongside an extended cab and four-door crew cab; its chassis-cab design was manufactured for the fitment of rear bodies fitted by second-stage manufacturers.

Powertrain details 
In contrast to the DuraStar, the TerraStar was sold with relatively few powertrain combinations. Through its entire production, the model line was offered with a MaxxForce 7 turbodiesel V8 paired with a Allison 1000 6-speed automatic. 

Originally configured solely with a single rear drive axle, four-wheel drive became available as an option in May 2013.

In 2015, Navistar moved away from EGR-based emissions systems, leading to the discontinuation of the MaxxForce 7 engine.  Effectively leaving the model line with no engine, International withdrew the model line after 2015 production.

Variants

Bus 
From 2010 to 2015, the TerraStar chassis was used by Navistar subsidiary IC Bus to develop its smallest vehicle ever produced.  Intended largely as a heavier-duty alternative to vehicles produced on Ford E-450 and GMC Savana chassis, IC Bus introduced cutaway-cab buses derived from the TerraStar.  The company marketed two versions, including the AC-Series shuttle bus and the AE-Series school bus.

In line with its truck counterpart, the AC/AE was discontinued at the end of 2015, following the withdrawal of the MaxxForce 7 engine.

Vehicle conversions 
Although never offered as a consumer vehicle, during its production, the International TerraStar served as a donor chassis for second-party conversions. In a configuration similar to the larger International XT trucks, the crew-cab TerraStar was converted by Elkhart, Indiana-based Midwest Automotive Designs to a pickup truck or a four-door SUV.

References

Navistar International trucks
Class 5 trucks
Vehicles introduced in 2010